The State Committee for City Building and Architecture is a governmental agency within the Cabinet of Azerbaijan in charge of regulating the urban construction and development and overseeing architectural activities in Azerbaijan. The Committee is headed by Anar Guliyev.

History
The committee was established on February 28, 2006 on the basis of State Construction and Architecture Committee which was abolished on the same day and its component entities of Azərdövlətsənayelayihə State Design Institute, State Appraisal Department were transferred to the Ministry of Emergency Situations. On April 4, 2007, in accordance with the Presidential Decree No. 2081, Abbas Alasgarov was appointed as its chairman.

Structure
The committee is headed by the Chairman of the collegium of six members which include the chairman of Nakhichevan AR Committee for City Building and Architecture, chief of Administration of State Committee for City Building and Architecture, director of the  Department of Architecture within the committee, director of the Department for Documentation and Compliance of Architectural Planning, director of Azərmemarlayihə State Design Institute and director of Baku State Design Institute.
Main functions of the committee are ensuring compliance of urban construction with the state policies of Azerbaijan Republic; development of the city building sector; protection and preservation of traditions of city building and national architecture; assurance of proper use of territories and their resources in cities and their surroundings; preparations of city building methodologies and manuals; assurance in increasing quality in architectural planning and design of buildings, towers and other complexes, etc. 
The committee, in cooperation with Mayoralty of Baku and other executive governmental offices, also oversees preservation and storage of dismantled monuments. One of the largest projects on the committee's agenda is the development of Greater Baku, a project to be funded by the World Bank for development of Baku, Sumgayit, Absheron for the next 20 years.

Statue 
The State Town Building and Architecture Committee of Azerbaijan is governed by the Constitution of Azerbaijan, Presidential decrees and orders, Cabinet of Ministers` decisions, and international treaties which are also supported by Azerbaijan. The Committee operates in association with other executive power and local self-governing bodies and non-governmental organizations.

It has an independent balance, public property, seal, treasury and bank accounts, and own title, corresponding stamps and forms. The Committee is funded by the state budget and other sources identified by legislation.

Committee`s activities and duties 
The State Town Building and Architecture Committee of Azerbaijan is responsible for protection of the town building and national architectural traditions and along with corresponding executive power and local self-governing bodies the effective use of territories of towns, settlements historically formed around them taking into consideration their natural and local features.

It also assures creation of the standard-methodological support for implementation of the public town building cadastre and implementation of the town building cadastre in the way set for the republic, in parallel, development of the architectural planning and projecting solutions of buildings, establishments and their complexes;

Duties of the Committee include:

 The Committee carries out the following functions in accordance with the directions defined by its Statute:
 To carry out the regulatory regulation within its competence in the relevant field;
 To ensure implementation of state programs and development concepts within their competence;
 To ensure the fulfillment of international agreements 
 To carry out state control over the relevant fields in accordance with the legislation;
 To improve quality, technical and economical solution level, as well as general scheme and regional schemes of territorial arrangement of the population, use of natural resources and territorial arrangements of the population of Azerbaijan, schemes and projects of district planning, general plans and detailed planning projects of urban and other settlements, etc.
 To take measures together with the relevant executive authorities and self-governing bodies for the maintenance, protection and enrichment of national and historical heritage, town-planning, architectural monuments, natural-cultural landscapes and other conservation areas;
 To ensure modernity and national architectural style in the renovation works carried out in the cities and districts, at newly constructed facilities;
 To ensure the preparation of standards, norms and regulations in accordance with the requirements of the legislation within the scope of their competence and to give opinion on the field and business regulatory documents prepared by other enterprises and organizations in the relevant field;
 To participate in the preparation of the General Plan, detailed planning, project and scientific researches of the settlements within the scope of the funds provided for these purposes in the state budget according to the legislation, in the preparation and implementation of targeted and scientific-technical programs;
 To participate in the preparation of measures to protect residential areas and systems from natural disaster and incidents, together with relevant executive authorities;
 To issue special permit (license), as well as to provide legal documents, in the cases and in the manner prescribed by law;
 To establish appropriate regulatory and methodological framework for the organization of the State Urban Development Cadastre service, organize a single system monitoring of urban development facilities at the republican level and to create and maintain a whole State Land Cadastre Fund;

The rights of the Committee 

 To prepare draft or draft legislation relating to the relevant field/participate in their preparation;
 To make an initiative to support the Republic of Azerbaijan in the relevant international agreements;
 To approve the regulations of the local executive authorities' architectural and urban planning services in accordance with the established procedure and to approve the appointment of chief architects; 
 To ensure compliance with the urban planning standards in the implementation of project solutions for urban planning documentation (General plans, district and neighborhood planning, detailed planning projects, etc.) for project planning, and to coordinate all architectural and planning solutions of unique buildings and facilities realise;
 To give an opinion on the allocation of the land for the restoration of the greenhouses; 
 To make changes in the general plan in accordance with the legislation. 
 To make comments on the normative legal acts on the development of the relevant fields; 
 To give other opinions according to the direction of activity, to make analyzes and summaries, to prepare analytical materials, to carry out scientific researches and make relevant proposals; 
 To take measures within the scope of its competence when the cases of violation of urban planning legislation are revealed; 
 To cooperate with relevant international organizations, relevant state bodies (agencies) of foreign states in the order established by the legislation, to study the relevant experience of foreign states; 
 To make inquiries about the necessary information (documents) to the state and local self-government bodies, physical persons and legal entities on the relevant field and receive such information (documents) from them; 
 To take measures and make suggestions for the preparation and training of specialists in the relevant field; 
 To involve independent experts and specialists in their activities in the manner prescribed by law; 
 To improve the scientific and technical information of the relevant field, to create a database of normative documents, information networks, websites, special bulletins and other publications in accordance with the legislation within the scope of funds provided for this purpose;
 To publish normative documents on the relevant area in the amount of funds intended for this purpose; 
 To give advice and comments within the scope of their authority in relation to the application of norms, rules and standards in the relevant field; 
 Analyze and discuss the activities of the subordinate entities and make relevant decisions accordingly; 
 To carry out other rights stipulated by the legislation in accordance with their activities.

Departments 
City Planning Department

Department of Urban Cadastre

Department of Architecture

Planning and Architectural Planning Department

Department of Economics

Project and Scientific Department

Department of City Planning and Architectural Control

Technical Regulations and Licensing Department

Engineering department

Department of International Relations and Information

Finance, Accounting

Department of Personnel, Labor and Social Affairs

Common department

Sub-organizations

Azermemarlayiha State Project 
The Azermemarlayiha state project began its activity in 1930 as the Kolkhoz Cooperative Construction Bureau. Since its establishment, the main activity of the organization has been the design of important agricultural facilities, district planning projects, drawing up master plans for cities and districts, and designing public and residential buildings.

AzIMETI 
The Azerbaijan Research Institute of Construction and Architecture was created on the basis of the Resolution of the Council of Ministers of the USSR dated June 13, 1984, and the Council of Ministers of the Azerbaijan SSR.

The Institute aims at developing new favorable and reliable building solutions for buildings and structures, building, studying various building structures and engineering techniques, as well as studying and strengthening buildings and structures and improving the principles of urban planning in accordance with local climatic and social conditions, studying The new progressive architecture and national traditions of architecture.

Baku State Design Institute 
Baku State Design Institute was founded in 1937. Since its inception, the institute has been engaged in project activities, during which problems of urban planning were solved and schemes and projects for engineering and transport infrastructure were developed. Since 2005, the Institute is the author of the General Plan of the city of Baku. The institute's activities include regional planning projects, master plans, detailed planning projects, construction projects of residential areas, residential and civil buildings projects, engineering and communication infrastructure, environmental protection, ecology, dendrology, drainage, geodetic and geological research.

See also
Cabinet of Azerbaijan
Architecture of Azerbaijan

References

Government agencies of Azerbaijan
Government agencies established in 2006
2006 establishments in Azerbaijan
Architecture in Azerbaijan